Arni may refer to:

Municipalities
 Arni, Tiruvannamalai, a town in Tamil Nadu, India
 Arni, Maharashtra, in Yavatmal district, Maharashtra State, India
 Arni, Karditsa, a municipality in the Karditsa regional unit, Greece
 Arni, Aargau, a municipality of the canton of Aargau in Switzerland
 Arni, Bern, a municipality of the canton of Bern in Switzerland

Other uses
 Árni, Icelandic given name
 a nickname for Arnold
 Arni, Clerodendrum phlomidis, a traditional Indian medicinal herb
 Arni or arnee, the wild water buffalo, Bubalus arnee
 Lake Arni or Arnisee
 ARNi, angiotensin receptor-neprilysin inhibitor: Valsartan/sacubitril

See also
 Arani (disambiguation)
 Arny (disambiguation)